This is a list of British television related events from 1942.

Events

There are no events for 1942 in British television as broadcasting had been suspended for the duration of the Second World War. This was done amid fears the signals would help German bombers. Television broadcasting resumed in 1946.

Births
 3 January – John Thaw, English actor (died 2002)
 5 January – Jan Leeming, journalist, television presenter and newsreader
 8 January – Robin Ellis, English actor
 19 January – Michael Crawford, English singer and actor
 1 February – Terry Jones, Welsh comedic actor and writer (died 2020)
 7 February – Gareth Hunt, English actor (died 2007)
 25 March – Richard O'Brien, English actor and writer
 27 March – Michael York, English actor
 29 March – Julie Goodyear, actress and television personality
 12 May – Pam St Clement, born Pamela Clements, actress
 19 May – Robert Kilroy-Silk, politician and television presenter
 8 June – Fred Dinenage, television presenter
 17 July – Peter Sissons, journalist (died 2019)
 16 August – John Challis, actor (died 2021)
 17 September – Des Lynam, television presenter
 24 November – Billy Connolly, Scottish comedian
 29 November – Michael Craze, actor (died 1998)
 4 December – Gemma Jones, actress
 15 December – Geoffrey Davies, actor

Deaths
October – Bernard Natan, co-founder (with John Logie Baird) of France's first television company, Télévision-Baird-Natan, aged 56

See also
 1942 in British music
 1942 in the United Kingdom
 List of British films of 1942